

This is a list of the National Register of Historic Places listings in St. Charles Parish, Louisiana.

This is intended to be a complete list of the properties and districts on the National Register of Historic Places in St. Charles Parish, Louisiana, United States. The locations of National Register properties and districts for which the latitude and longitude coordinates are included below, may be seen in a map.

There are 7 properties and districts listed on the National Register in the parish, including 1 National Historic Landmark.

Current listings

|}

See also
List of National Historic Landmarks in Louisiana
National Register of Historic Places listings in Louisiana

References

St. Charles Parish